"Tail of Hope" is a song recorded by South Korean singer BoA, released on June 26, 2013. The song serves as the theme song for the Japanese Fuji-TV drama Hakui no Namida.  The B-side is the song "Baby You...", a rewritten Japanese version of her Korean song "Disturbance".

Background
"Tail of Hope" is the theme song for the Japanese drama Hakui no Namida, which began airing on April 1, 2013. This is BoA's thirty-third Japanese single and was released on June 26, 2013. A Japanese version of BoA's self-written Korean song "Disturbance" released earlier in January 2013 is the single's B-side. An English version of the song released as a separate special edition CD was also made available exclusively to members of BoA's official fan club who purchased both the CD and CD+DVD editions.

Track listing

Weekly Charts

Personnel

Personnel details were sourced from the liner notes booklet of "Tail of Hope."

Anna – Hair, make-up
Andrew Gilbert – arrangement (#1, #3)
Yu Hamashima – "Tail of Hope" music video producer
Kim Terung – arrangement (#2, #4)
Kim Yongshin – arrangement (#2, #4)
Kwon BoA – vocals
Kwon Soonwook – "Disturbance" music video director
Metaoloz Creative Group – "Disturbance" music video production

Daniel Sherman – arrangement (#1, #3)
Satsuki Naono – creative coordination
Claire Rodrigues – arrangement (#1, #3)
Chie Sekine – graphic design
Shino Suganuma – styling
Toshiyuki Suzuki – art direction, "Tail of Hope" music video director
Tisch – photographer

References

2013 singles
BoA songs
Japanese-language songs
SM Entertainment singles
Avex Trax singles
2013 songs